Ernest Atkins may refer to:
Ernest Clive Atkins, British soldier
Ernest Faram Atkins, Australian footballer